Tornike Kipiani (born 11 December 1987) is a Georgian singer. Kipiani started his musical career at the age of 19, forming the band The Circular Corner. In 2012, he auditioned for the Georgian talent show Magtifan on Maestro, placing in the top five of the competition. Kipiani also won the first season of X Factor Georgia in 2014, mentored by Tamta. 

He entered the selection process for Georgia in the Eurovision Song Contest 2017 with the song "You Are My Sunshine", sung with Giorgi Bolotashvili. The song finished 23rd out of the 25 entries in the national final. However he was selected to represent his country in the Eurovision Song Contest 2020 after winning Georgian Idol. He was to perform in Rotterdam, Netherlands with the song "Take Me as I Am", however the contest was cancelled due to the COVID-19 pandemic. Instead, he represented Georgia at the Eurovision Song Contest 2021 with the song "You", but he failed to qualify to the grand final.

Outside of music, Kipiani works as an architect. He has three children.

Discography

Albums
 2016: Luck

Singles
 2017: "You Are My Sunshine" (with Giorgi Bolotashvili)
 2020: "Take Me as I Am"
 2021: "You"

References

Living people
Eurovision Song Contest entrants of 2020
Eurovision Song Contest entrants of 2021
Eurovision Song Contest entrants for Georgia (country)
1987 births